Fauzan Fajri Nasrullah (born 18 May 1989), is an Indonesian professional footballer who plays as a centre-back for Liga 2 club PSIM Yogyakarta.

Club career

PSIS Semarang
In the 2012 season, Fauzan joined PSIS Semarang. In the 2014 season, Fauzan reunited with some of his colleagues in the Central Java soccer team for PON XVIII. Among them, Hari Nur Yulianto, Saptono, Vidi Hasiholan, Eli Nasokha, and Ivo Andre Wibowo. Since the season of 2014 Fauzan Fajri was trusted to be the team captain PSIS Semarang. Fauzan Fajri spent 5 seasons with PSIS Semarang since joining PSIS Semarang in 2012. Fauzan was marginalized from the PSIS squad at Indonesia Championship 2016 due to a knee injury he suffered for over a year.

Mitra Kukar
He was signed for Mitra Kukar to play in Liga 2 in the 2020 season. This season was suspended on 27 March 2020 due to the COVID-19 pandemic. The season was abandoned and was declared void on 20 January 2021.

Muba Babel United
In 2021, Fauzan Fajri signed with Indonesian Liga 2 club Muba Babel United.

Dewa United
In 2021, Fajri signed a contract with Indonesian Liga 2 club Dewa United. He made first 2021–22 Liga 2 debut on 18 October 2021, coming on as a starter in a 2–0 win against PSKC Cimahi at the Gelora Bung Karno Madya Stadium, Jakarta.

PSIM Yogyakarta
Fauzan was signed for PSIM Yogyakarta to play in Liga 2 on 2022 season.

Honours

Club 
Dewa United
 Liga 2 third place (play-offs): 2021

References

External links
 Fauzan Fajri at Soccerway
 Fauzan Fajri at Liga Indonesia

1989 births
Living people
Indonesian footballers
Liga 1 (Indonesia) players
Liga 2 (Indonesia) players
Mitra Kukar players
People from Semarang
Association football defenders
Sportspeople from Central Java
Dewa United F.C. players